Le Poizat-Lalleyriat is a commune in the Ain department of eastern France. The municipality was established on 1 January 2016 and consists of the former communes of Lalleyriat and Le Poizat.

Geography

Climate
Le Poizat-Lalleyriat has a oceanic climate (Köppen climate classification Cfb).

See also 
Communes of the Ain department

References 

Communes of Ain
Communes nouvelles of Ain
Populated places established in 2016
2016 establishments in France